Stemagoris is a genus of moths belonging to the family Tineidae.

There is presently only one species in this genus, Stemagoris asylaea Meyrick, 1911 that is found in South Africa.

References

Meyrick E. 1911c. Descriptions of South African Micro-Lepidoptera.. - Annals of the Transvaal Museum 3(1):63–83.

Tineidae
Tineidae genera
Taxa named by Edward Meyrick
Monotypic moth genera